Sir David Barnett Dundas, 2nd Baronet,  (28 August 1803 – 30 March 1877) was a Scottish advocate, Liberal politician and agricultural improver.

Life

He was the son of Robert Dundas of Beechwood, 1st Baronet Dundas (1761–1835) and Matilda Cockburn (daughter of Archibald Cockburn). He was born at the family mansion of Beechwood House near Corstorphine, west Edinburgh on 28 August 1803. In 1824, he acquired Henry Dundas's estate of Dunira in Perthshire. On his father's death in 1835, David became the 2nd Baronet.

Dundas was educated at Westminster School and at Christ Church, Oxford. He was called to the Bar at the Inner Temple in 1824, and appointed Queen's Counsel in February 1840.

He was elected to represent Sutherland in Parliament as a Liberal in March 1840. In July 1846 he was appointed Solicitor General for England and Wales. At the time, it was the normal practice that accepting ministerial office caused a by-election; he was re-elected on 28 July. 

In February 1846, he was knighted, a traditional perquisite of the office, but he resigned the position in March 1848 due to ill-health and returned to the backbenches. In May 1849, he was appointed Judge Advocate General, again re-elected in a by-election on 5 June, and made a member of the Privy Council on 29 June.

In 1851, he was elected a Fellow of the Royal Society of Edinburgh his proposer being John Cockburn, the wine merchant who founded Cockburns of Leith.

In 1852, he commissioned the architect William Burn to completely remodel the mansion at Dunira and lived there until the late 1860s.

He retired from politics in the 1852 general election, and was succeeded by the Marquess of Stafford, also a Liberal.

In retirement he lived and worked in his chambers at the Inner Temple; among other work, he served as a Trustee of the British Museum. His retirement from politics was not permanent; when Stafford was elevated to the House of Lords in March 1861 on becoming the third Duke of Sutherland, Dundas returned to Parliament. He stood down again in May 1867, being succeeded by Lord Ronald Sutherland-Leveson-Gower, the Duke's younger brother.

He died on 30 March 1877.

Family
He married twice: firstly on 29 November 1841 to Catherine Whyte-Melville (d. 23 April 1856), sister of writer George John Whyte-Melville; secondly in 1858 to Lady Lucy Anne Pelham (1815–1901), daughter of Thomas Pelham, 2nd Earl of Chichester. Lucy was a gifted amateur artist.

He had seven children by his first marriage: 
Georgina Catherine Dundas (1843–1859)
Robert Dundas (1844–1865), who died unmarried
David Pelham Dundas (1845–1856), who died in childhood
Sir Sydenham James Dundas, 3rd Baronet (1849–1904), who died unmarried 
Sir Charles Henry Dundas, 4th Baronet (1851–1908), who died unmarried
Sir George Whyte Melville Dundas, 5th Baronet (1856–1934), who married Matilda Louisa Mary Wilson, and had children
Lady Jane Dundas (died 1929), who married Reverend Francis Agnew Bickmore and had children

Dundas's second marriage produced a son. Sydenham Jaspar Dundas (1859–1909).

Publications
On the Potato Disease – Crop 1845 (1846)

References

Oliver & Boyd's new Edinburgh almanac and national repository for the year 1850. Oliver & Boyd, Edinburgh, 1850
Gordon Goodwin, "Dundas, Sir David (1799–1877)", rev. H. C. G. Matthew, Oxford Dictionary of National Biography, Oxford University Press, 2004 accessed 11 July 2006

External links
 

1803 births
1877 deaths
Members of the Parliament of the United Kingdom for Scottish constituencies
Members of the Privy Council of the United Kingdom
People educated at Westminster School, London
Baronets in the Baronetage of the United Kingdom
Alumni of Christ Church, Oxford
Scottish Liberal Party MPs
UK MPs 1837–1841
UK MPs 1841–1847
UK MPs 1847–1852
UK MPs 1859–1865
UK MPs 1865–1868
Whig (British political party) MPs for Scottish constituencies
Members of the Inner Temple
Knights Bachelor
Solicitors General for England and Wales
English King's Counsel
Scottish King's Counsel
19th-century King's Counsel